Cathy Forbes (later Warwick) was an English chess player.

Cathy Forbes (or similar) may also refer to:

Cathi Forbes, American politician

See also
Catherine Forbes (disambiguation)
Cathy Johnston-Forbes, American golfer